Squinter can refer to:
Guercino, Italian for squinter
Strabo (disambiguation), Latin for squinter
Gwich’in, known in French by the word for squinter (Loucheux)